Conus virgatus, common name the virgate Panama cone, is a species of sea snail, a marine gastropod mollusk in the family Conidae, the cone snails and their allies.

Like all species within the genus Conus, these snails are predatory and venomous. They are capable of "stinging" humans, therefore live ones should be handled carefully or not at all.

Description
The size of the shell varies between 35 mm and 70 mm. The rather narrow shell is pinkish white, continuously but irregularly longitudinally strigate with chestnut.

Distribution
This marine species occurs in the Pacific Ocean from Baja California, Mexico to North Peru.

References

 Tucker J.K. & Tenorio M.J. (2013) Illustrated catalog of the living cone shells. 517 pp. Wellington, Florida: MdM Publishing.

External links
 The Conus Biodiversity website
 Cone Shells – Knights of the Sea
 

virgatus
Gastropods described in 1849